The 1964 Savage Mountain B-52 crash was a U.S. military nuclear accident in which a Cold War bomber's vertical stabilizer broke off in winter storm turbulence. The two nuclear bombs being ferried were found "relatively intact in the middle of the wreckage", and after Fort Meade's 28th Ordnance Detachment secured them, the bombs were removed two days later to the Cumberland Municipal Airport.

Accident description
The B-52 D was returning to Georgia from Massachusetts after an earlier Chrome Dome airborne alert to Europe. Near Meyersdale, Pennsylvania, on a path east of Salisbury, Pennsylvania; and after altitude changes to evade severe turbulence; the vertical stabilizer broke off. The aircraft was left uncontrollable as a result; the pilot ordered the crew to bail out, and the aircraft crashed. The wreckage of the aircraft was found on the Stonewall Green farm. Today, the crash site is in a private meadow of Elbow Mountain within Savage River State Forest, along the public Savage Mountain Trail just north of the Pine Swamp Road crossing.

Crew
As the only crew member who did not eject, the radar bombardier died in the crash and was not located until more than 24 hours afterward. The navigator and tail gunner died of exposure in the snow. Unable to disentangle his chute he released the Koch fittings and fell over  through the tree, suffering injuries from the branches; his survival tent and other gear remained in the tree. He then attempted to find shelter and "meandered", eventually falling down a steep slope in the dark into a river basin.

The pilot parachuted onto Maryland's Meadow Mountain ridge near the Mason–Dixon line and, after being driven to the Tomlinson Inn on the National Road in Grantsville, notified the United States Air Force of the crash. The co-pilot landed near New Germany Road, remained where he landed, and stayed "cozy warm" until rescued.

See also

 1961 Goldsboro B-52 crash
 1963 Elephant Mountain B-52 crash
 American Airlines Flight 587
 List of aircraft structural failures

References

External links
 "Pilot Lands B-52 After Losing Tail". (Historic video of B-52H s/n 61-0023 landing without vertical stabilizer after test flight.) National Archives and Records Administration, archive id 2050727; local id 200-UN-37-19. 10 January 1965. MCA/Universal Pictures newsreel, hosted by Criticalpast.com.
 Buzz One Four – a documentary film about the incident by Matt McCormick.

Accidents and incidents involving the Boeing B-52 Stratofortress
Aviation accidents and incidents in the United States in 1964
Aviation accidents and incidents in Maryland
Garrett County, Maryland
Aviation accidents and incidents involving nuclear weapons
1964 in Maryland
Nuclear accidents and incidents in the United States
January 1964 events in the United States
Aviation accidents and incidents caused by in-flight structural failure